The 2004 FIA GT Donington 500 km was the sixth round the 2004 FIA GT Championship season. It took place at the Donington Park, United Kingdom, on 27 June 2004.

Several competitors from the British GT Championship participated in this event, although the TVR Tuscans were required to run in a separate special class due to the cars not meeting N-GT homologation requirements. The #5 Vitaphone Saleen overtook the #17 JMB Ferrari for the lead, then quickly build up a gap of 8 seconds. In the last lap at the chicane, the #5 had come together with the #99 Porsche and the former suffered a puncture. The damage to the Saleen was enough to lose the win as Jaime Melo retake the lead in the final corner. Matteo Bobbi was able to unlap the #17 Ferrari on the final corner as well and gained a lap advantage.

Official results
Class winners in bold. Cars failing to complete 70% of winner's distance marked as Not Classified (NC).

Statistics
 Pole position – #4 Konrad Motorsport – 1:40.747
 Fastest lap – #5 Vitaphone Racing Team – 1:28.906
 Average speed – 156.670 km/h

References

 
 
 

D
Donington 500
Donington 500